Kathmandu–Terai Expressway, also known as Fast Track, is an under construction road connecting Kathmandu and Nijgadh in southern Terai region of Nepal. The expressway is being constructed by Nepal Army, originally scheduled to be completed by September 2021. The new set target date for completion is 2024. As of July 2021, 16.1% of the work has been completed.

The consulting service for the construction is provided by Yooshin Engineering, a Korean firm. The most complicated section, including the tunnels and several bridges will be constructed by Chinese companies China State Construction Engineering and Poly Changda Engineering.

Controversies
In 2020, the Nepal Army had selected six international firms to provide consultation service for the project, however the process was stopped after a probe found that the selection criteria were leaked.

See also
National Highway System (Nepal)
Nijgadh International Airport, which will be connected to Kathmandu by the expressway

References

External links
 Official website of the project

Highways in Nepal
National Pride Projects
Transport in Kathmandu